Jeffrey Berger may refer to:

 Jeffrey J. Berger (born 1955), American Democratic politician in the state of Connecticut
 Jeffrey W. Berger (1963–2001), American vitreoretinal surgeon and engineer
Geoffrey Berger of Piper Aircraft